Uman is a city located in Cherkasy Oblast in central Ukraine, to the east of Vinnytsia. Uman serves as the administrative center of Uman Raion (district). It hosts the administration of Uman urban hromada, one of the hromadas of Ukraine. Population: 

Among Ukrainians, Uman is known for its depiction of the Haidamak rebellions in Taras Shevchenko's longest of poems, Haidamaky ("The Haidamaks", 1843). The city is also a pilgrimage site for Breslov Hasidic Jews and a major center of gardening research containing the dendrological park Sofiyivka and the University of Gardening.

Uman (Humań) was a privately owned city of Poland and the Polish–Lithuanian Commonwealth.

History
Uman was first mentioned in historical documents in 1616, when it was under Polish rule. It was part of the Bracław Voivodeship of the Lesser Poland Province of the Polish Crown. Its role at this time was as a defensive fort to withstand Tatar raids, containing a prominent Cossack regiment that was stationed within the town. In 1648 it was taken from the Poles by Ivan Hanzha, colonel to Cossack leader Bohdan Khmelnytsky, and Uman was converted to the administrative center of cossack regiment for the region. Poland retook Uman in 1667, after which the town was deserted by many of its residents who fled eastward to Left-bank Ukraine. From 1670–1674, Uman was a residence to the Hetman of right-bank Ukraine.. It was part of Ottoman Empire between 1672 and 1699.

Under the ownership of the Potocki family of Polish nobles (1726–1832) Uman grew in economic and cultural importance. A Basilian monastery and school were established in this time.

The Uman region was site of haidamaky uprisings in 1734, 1750, and 1768. Notably during the latter, Cossack rebels Maksym Zalizniak and Ivan Gonta captured Uman during the Koliyivshchyna uprising against Polish rule. During this revolt, a massacre took place against Jews, Poles and Ukrainian Uniates. On the very first day large numbers of Ukrainians deserted the ranks of Polish forces and joined the rebels when the city was surrounded. Thousands from the surrounding areas fled to the Cossack garrison in Uman for protection. The military commander of Uman, Mladanovich, betrayed the city's Jews and allowed the pursuing Cossacks in, in exchange for clemency towards the Polish population. In the span of three days an estimated 20,000 Poles and Jews were slain with extreme cruelty, according to numerous Polish sources, with one source giving an estimate of 2,000 casualties.

With the 1793 Second Partition of Poland, Uman became part of the Russian Empire and a number of aristocratic residences were built there. In 1795 Uman became a povit/uezd center in Voznesensk Governorate, and in 1797, in Kyiv Governorate.

Into the 20th century, Uman was linked by rail to Kyiv and Odessa, leading to rapid development of its industrial sector. Its population grew from 10,100 in 1860 to 29,900 in 1900 and over 50,000 in 1914. According to the Russian census of 1897, Uman with a population of 31,016 was the second largest city of Podolia after Kamianets-Podilskyi.

In 1941, the Battle of Uman took place in the vicinity of the town, where the German army encircled Soviet positions. Adolf Hitler and Benito Mussolini visited Uman in 1941.  Uman was occupied by German forces from August 1, 1941, to March 10, 1944.

In January 1989 the population was 90,596 people.

Today the city has optical and farm-machinery plants, a cannery, a brewery, a vitamin factory, a sewing factory, a footwear factory, and other industrial enterprises. Its highest educational institutions are the Uman National University of Horticulture and the Uman State Pedagogical University. The main architectural monuments are the catacombs of the old fortress, the Basilian monastery (1764), the city hall (1780–2), the Dormition Roman Catholic church in the Classicist style (1826), and 19th-century trading stalls.

Uman's landmark is a famous park complex, Sofiyivka (Софiївка; Polish: Zofiówka), founded in 1796 by Count Stanisław Szczęsny Potocki, a Polish noble, who named it for his wife Sofia. The park features a number of waterfalls and narrow, arching stone bridges crossing the streams and scenic ravines.

Until 18 July 2020, Uman was designated as a city of oblast significance and did not belong to Uman Raion even though it was the center of the raion. As part of the administrative reform of Ukraine, which reduced the number of raions of Cherkasy Oblast to four, the city was merged into Uman Raion.

During the Russian invasion of Ukraine, Uman was hit by Russian artillery on February 24, 2022 which led to the death of a cyclist. The incident was caught on camera.

Jewish community
A large Jewish community lived in Uman in the 18th and 19th centuries. During the Second World War, in 1941, the Battle of Uman took place in the vicinity of the town, where the German army encircled Soviet positions. The Germans deported the entire Jewish community, murdering some 17,000 Jews, and completely destroyed the Jewish cemetery, burial place of the victims of the 1768 uprising as well as Rebbe Nachman of Breslov.  After the war, a Breslov Hasid managed to locate the Rebbe's grave and preserved it when the Soviets turned the entire area into a housing project.

Since the 1990s there has been a small, but growing, Jewish population in Uman, concentrated around Rebbe Nachman of Breslov tomb on Pushkina street. The local Jews are mostly involved in pilgrimage of Jewish tourists that arrive to the town.
In 2018 the community saw large growth with about 10–20 families coming from Israel, accompanied by a small movement of young American couples. Newcomers to the city are concentrating around Skhidna St, with some toward Nova Uman area.
In conjunction with this growth in the community, a new school of Yiddish was established.

Pilgrimage to Rebbe Nachman's grave

Every Rosh Hashana, there is a major pilgrimage by tens of thousands of Hasidim and others from around the world to the burial site of Rebbe Nachman of Breslov, located on the former site of the Jewish cemetery in a rebuilt synagogue. Rebbe Nachman Me'Uman spent the last five months of his life in Uman, and specifically requested to be buried there. As believed by the Breslov Hasidim, before his death he solemnly promised to intercede on behalf of anyone who would come to pray on his grave on Rosh Hashana, "be he the worst of sinners"; thus, a pilgrimage to this grave provides the best chance of getting unscathed through the stern judgement which, according to Jewish faith, Hashem passes on everybody on Yom Kippur.

The Rosh Hashana pilgrimage dates back to 1811, when the Rebbe's foremost disciple, Nathan of Breslov, organized the first such pilgrimage on the Rosh Hashana after the Rebbe's death. The annual pilgrimage attracted hundreds of Hasidim from Ukraine, Belarus, Lithuania and Poland throughout the 19th and early 20th centuries, until the Bolshevik Revolution of 1917 sealed the border between Russia and Poland. A handful of Soviet Hasidim continued to make the pilgrimage clandestinely; some were discovered by the KGB and exiled to Siberia, where they died. The pilgrimage ceased during World War II and resumed on a drastically smaller scale in 1948. From the 1960s until end of the Cold War in 1989, several hundred American and Israeli Hasidim made their way to Uman, both legally and illegally, to pray at the grave of Rebbe Nachman. In 1988, the Soviets allowed 250 men to visit the Rebbe's grave for Rosh Hashana; the following year, over 1,000 Hasidim gathered in Uman for Rosh Hashana 1989. In 1990, 2,000 Hasidim attended. In 2008, attendance reached 25,000 men and boys. In 2018, over 30,000 Jews made the Rosh Hashanah pilgrimage to Uman.

In the mid-2010s, Israeli Hasidim from many sectors of Israel's Ultra-Orthodox community, including many Mizrahi Jewish rabbis, make the pilgrimage.  The event brings together a wide variety of Orthodox society, from Yemenite yeshiva students, to former Israeli prison inmates, and American hippies. In 2022, following the Russian invasion of Ukraine, the number of pilgrims coming to Uman for Jewish New Year was approximately 10,000, or about one-third of the number in 2021.

Economy
The annual pilgrimage is regarded as Uman's main economic industry.

Controversy
The pilgrimage has drawn protests from residents due to the large influx of  visitors from Israel, and the consequent strain on security and utility.

Personnel of Ben Gurion airport, other Israeli tourists and El Al pilots have also complained about Hasidic pilgrims abusing drugs and hard liquor and harassing fellow passengers to Ukraine. Common complaints from Uman residents relate to the loud noise, singing, rowdiness, widespread drinking, drug use and fighting the pilgrims cause. (Uman) locals have also complained about the cordoning off of neighborhoods by police and the internal trade that has developed among pilgrims. Heavy alcoholic drinking and cannabis smoking is prevalent amongst the pilgrims, many of them young men, with some describing it as a party event. Hippies have been seen taking LSD on the pilgrimage.  Dancing in the streets to trance music is common and the event has been likened to the Burning Man festival.

The pilgrimage has led to several clashes over the years. In September 2010, several cases of violence and riots broke out among Hasidic pilgrims after members of the Evangelical Church arrived from Odesa to preach their faith, leading to 10 Hasidic pilgrims being deported. A few days later ten Hasidic pilgrims were deported back to Israel and banned from Ukraine for five years for disrupting public order and causing bodily harm to citizens. At the end of September 2010 an Israeli Hasid was stabbed and killed in an altercation that broke out following the vandalism of a car owned by Jews. Allegedly his stabbing was a retaliation for the stabbing and wounding of a local (Ukrainian) by an Israeli. In September 2013 three Israeli police officers were deported after getting involved in a bar brawl during the Rosh Hashanah gathering in Uman. In the 2014 pilgrimage, organizers were fined $15,000 by the city of Uman for illegally operating a "tent city" to house 2,500 pilgrims. The controversy is the subject of the 2015 documentary film, The Dybbuk. A Tale of Wandering Souls. In 2015 pilgrims staying in a residential tower began tossing rocks and bottles from above onto a car, and when at one point a local policeman's hat was knocked off, police with German Shepherds were called to scatter the crowd. In 2010 an Israeli police officer (sent to monitor security) commented “people get drunk and act crazy in the streets, go out to pubs and hit on women and harass them. They do all types of things that they would never do in Israel, but they come out here and feel like they can do it.” Anshel Pfeffer reported (for Haaretz) in 2018 that an Israeli diplomat told him that  "roughly only half of those who come to Uman do so for religious reasons, and the other half are simply the dregs who come to get drunk, take drugs and visit prostitutes," Pfeffer himself did not find any evidence of prostitution in Uman.

Climate

Science and education

Twin towns – sister cities

Uman is twinned with:

 Ashkelon, Israel
 Davis, California, United States
 Gniezno, Poland
 Haapsalu, Estonia
 Kórnik, Poland
 Łańcut, Poland
 Milford Haven, Wales, United Kingdom
 Nof HaGalil, Israel
 Radviliškis, Lithuania
 Romilly-sur-Seine, France
 Safed, Israel

Gallery

See also
Sofiyivsky Park – a landscape park near the city

References

Bibliography
  (1972) Історіа міст і сіл Української CCP - Черкаська область (History of Towns and Villages of the Ukrainian SSR - Cherkasy Oblast), Kyiv.

External links

 Uman in the Encyclopedia of Ukraine
 Uman informational portal
 Evening Uman. Uman informational portal and newspaper
 Uman photos. Uman biggest photos collection portal
 Uman videos. YouTube channel of videos of Uman
 All about Uman 
History of Jewish Community in Uman
 Uman News and informational portal 

 
Cities in Cherkasy Oblast
Umansky Uyezd
Bratslav Voivodeship
Cossack Hetmanate
Breslov Hasidism
Jewish pilgrimage sites
Shtetls
Populated places established in 1616
Cities of regional significance in Ukraine
1616 establishments in the Polish–Lithuanian Commonwealth
Holocaust locations in Ukraine